Stephanie Parker (29 March 1987 – 18 April 2009) was a Welsh actress, best known for playing Stacey Weaver on BBC Wales' television series, Belonging, since the age of 15. She also appeared in Casualty, Doc Martin and BBC Radio 4 dramas.

Death 
She was discovered hanged near Pontypridd at about 6am on 18 April 2009; this is believed to have been suicide. She was 22 years old.

References

External links 
 

1987 births
2009 deaths
Suicides by hanging in Wales
Suicides in Wales
Welsh television actresses
People from Brighton
21st-century British actresses
2009 suicides